The  is a national expressway in Okayama Prefecture, Japan. It is owned and operated by West Nippon Expressway Company.

Naming
The expressway is officially referred to as the Chūgoku-Ōdan Expressway Okayama Yonago Route. The Chūgoku-Ōdan Expressway Okayama Yonago Route is the official designation for the Sanyō Expressway between Okayama Interchange and Okayama Junction, the Okayama Expressway between Okayama Junction and Hokubō Junction, the Chūgoku Expressway between Hokubō Junction and Ochiai Junction, and the Yonago Expressway between Ochiai Junction and Yonago Interchange (concurrent with the Chūgoku-Ōdan Expressway Okayama Yonago Route).

Overview
The first section of the expressway was opened in 1991. The final section of the expressway (41.2 km between Okayama-Sōja Interchange and Hokubō Junction) was opened on March 15, 1997. The route originates from its junction with the Sanyō Expressway and extends northward. At its northern terminus it connects to the Chūgoku Expressway.

The expressway is 4 lanes from Okayama Junction to Kayō Interchange and the remainder is 2 lanes. The speed limit is 80 km/h on 4-laned sections and 70 km/h on 2-laned sections.

List of interchanges and features

 IC - interchange, SIC - smart interchange, JCT - junction, SA - service area, PA - parking area, BS - bus stop, TN - tunnel, BR - bridge

External links 
 West Nippon Expressway Company

Expressways in Japan